Hum 2 Hamaray 100 is a 2022-2023 Pakistani television comedy series directed and produced by Angeline Malik under banner "Angelic Films". It stars Furqan Qureshi, Hajra Yamin, Adnan Shah Tipu and Ayesha Gul in leading roles.

Cast
Furqan Qureshi as Arsalan
Hajra Yamin as Noor
Adnan Shah Tipu as Shamsuddin
Ayesha Gul as Bilqees
Samina Ahmed as Chimmi Khaala
Sana Askari as Urooj
Taqi Ahmed as Mujji aka Majid
Rana Majid as Shoki
Pari Hashmi as Beena
Nazli Nasr as Ayesha
Kashif Javed as Jameel aka Jimmy
Mona Shah as Amber
Angeline Malik as Shaista
Syed Rasikh Ismail as Rasiq
Hammad Shaikh as Raja
Reham Rafiq as Mehreen
Ilsa Mehreen as Riffat
Ahmed Usman as Puma 
Ali Ahmed Ibrahim as Kammo
Emaanay as Juggan
Angel Kainat as Ainee
Uzair Abbasi as Hameed
Khizar Jahangir as Waheed

References

External Links

 Pakistani television series